Albania-Greece relations over the last hundred years, which coincide with the modern history of the Albanian state, have been dominated by two fundamental issues: territorial/border disputes and the issue of minorities, phenomena typical of two nations and neighboring states.

List of diplomatic representatives of Albania to Greece (1920–present)

Ambassadors

Consuls

References 

 
Greece
Albania